"This Is How We Do It" is the debut single by American singer Montell Jordan. It was released by Def Jam Recordings on February 6, 1995 as the lead single from his debut album, also titled This Is How We Do It (1995). The single was Def Jam's first R&B release.

The song is representative of the hip hop soul style popular at the time. The song features Jordan singing over an enhanced Teddy Riley drumbeat sample of Slick Rick's "Children's Story" which in turn has an added interpolation of the bass of Bob James' "Nautilus". "This Is How We Do It" peaked at number one on the Billboard Hot 100 on April 15, 1995, rising from number six the previous week and displacing Madonna's "Take a Bow" from the top spot. It remained at number one for seven consecutive weeks. It was also number one for seven weeks on the R&B singles chart. The single sold one million copies domestically and earned a platinum certification from the RIAA.

The song earned Jordan a Grammy Award nomination for Best Male R&B Vocal Performance at the 38th Annual Grammy Awards. The same year, the song was named Best R&B 12-inch at the International Dance Music Awards in Miami.

Critical reception
Chuck Campbell from Knoxville News Sentinel found that the track "combines enough elements to make for an unavoidable crossover hit, as Jordan's lilting voice meshes with "phat" beats, an incessant title refrain and a sample of rapper Slick Rick's "Children's Story"." Connie Johnson from Los Angeles Times felt the R&B crooner and songwriter "has a youthful bravado", describing the song as "hard-slammin’". Ralph Tee from British magazine Music Weeks RM Dance Update wrote, "This record is typical of everything that urban contemporary soul is about with its chugging swing/funk rhythms and intense Aaron Hall-style vocal and it's been flying out on import lately. Its main appeal is the infectious multi-vocal chorus, blasting out the song's title to ram home its anthemic qualities." He remarked that "there's masses of dancefloor appeal". Another editor, James Hamilton, described "This Is How We Do It" as a "soulfully whined, chanted and rapped rolling jackswing joller". 

Track listing
 CD single, Europe (1995)"This Is How We Do It" (LP Version) — 3:59
"This Is How We Do It" (LP Instrumental) — 3:44
"I Wanna" (LP Version) — 5:25
"This Is How We Do It" (Acappella) — 3:47

 CD single, UK (1995)"This Is How We Do It" (Radio Mix) — 3:43
"This Is How We Do It" (Tee's Radio Mix) — 3:46
"This Is How We Do It" (Tee's Club Mix) — 5:19
"This Is How We Do It" (Barr 9 Mix) — 4:05
"This Is How We Do It" (Tee's Dub Mix) — 4:51
"This Is How We Do It" (Wino Mix) — 3:58

Charts

Weekly charts

Year-end charts

 Decade-end charts 

All-time charts

Certifications

Mis-Teeq version

In 2002, British girl group Mis-Teeq released their version as a double A-side with "Roll On", titled "Roll On / This Is How We Do It'''". It peaked at number 7 on the UK charts, faring four places better than the original. The original by Jordan was featured in the 2002 film Ali G Indahouse, along with the Rishi Rich mix of Mis-Teeq's version, which is also on the film's soundtrack. "This Is How We Do It" is included on the Special Edition of the album Lickin' on Both Sides''.

Charts

The Party (This Is How We Do It)

Dutch DJ Joe Stone released a remixed version of the song in 2015 with Jordan credited as the featured artist.

Background

Formats and track listings

Charts

Release history

See also
 List of Billboard Hot 100 number-one singles of 1995
 List of number-one R&B singles of 1995 (U.S.)

References

1994 songs
1995 debut singles
2002 singles
2015 debut singles
Montell Jordan songs
Mis-Teeq songs
Billboard Hot 100 number-one singles
Number-one singles in Zimbabwe
Songs written by Montell Jordan
Music videos directed by Hype Williams
New jack swing songs
Def Jam Recordings singles
Telstar Records singles
Spinnin' Records singles